Kokomo Speedway is a quarter mile (0.4 km) dirt semi-banked oval racing track in Kokomo, Indiana. The track hosts weekly Sunday night races during the American summer months. It has hosted or currently hosts national tours for sprint, late models, midget, and ARCA stock cars.

History
When the track was built in 1947, it was designed for midget car racing. It was built by Albert Miller and John Rose. The track opened on July 6, 1947.  The only winged USAC sprint car event in track history was held on June 23, 1991, and it was won by Kelly Kinser.

Touring Series
The track is one of the venues for the Indiana Sprintweeks of USAC Sprint Cars. ESPN's Thunder show covered live Sprintweek races at the track in the 1990s. It currently holds events on the Lucas Oil Late Model Dirt Series and World of Outlaws Sprint Car series. It has held races in the ARCA Series, USAC Sprint Cars, and USAC National midgets. It holds the annual Kokomo Klash race with headline classes sprint cars, midget cars, late models, and modifieds in October.

Notable alumni

Bryan Clauson - 2014 Sprint Car track champion
Dave Darland - 1987 / 1991 / 1993 / 1994 Sprint Car track champion
Justin Grant - 2017 / 2019 Sprint Car track champion
Cole Whitt - 2009 Sprint Car track champion
Chris Windom - 2010 Sprint Car track champion

Bob Kinser - 1972-1976 & 1978-1980 Sprint Car track Champion

Shane Cottle - 2004, 2005, 2007, 2011 Sprint Car Track Champion

Images

References

External links
Official website

Tourist attractions in Howard County, Indiana
Dirt oval race tracks in the United States
Motorsport venues in Indiana
Sports venues completed in 1954
Buildings and structures in Howard County, Indiana
Midget car racing
Sprint car racing